The knockout stage of the 1995 FIFA Women's World Cup was the second and final stage of the competition, following the group stage. It began on 13 June with the quarter-finals and ended on 18 June 1995 with the final match, held at the Råsunda Stadium in Solna. A total of eight teams (the top two teams from each group, along with the two best third-placed teams) advanced to the knockout stage to compete in a single-elimination style tournament.

All times listed are local, CEST (UTC+2).

Format
In the knockout stage, if a match was level at the end of 90 minutes of normal playing time, extra time was played (two periods of 15 minutes each). If still tied after extra time, the match was decided by a penalty shoot-out to determine the winner.

The quarter-final match-ups depended on the two third-placed teams which qualified. FIFA set out the following schedule for the semi-finals:
 Match 23: Winner Match 19 v Winner Match 20
 Match 24: Winner Match 21 v Winner Match 22

The third place play-off match-up was:
 Match 25: Loser Match 23 v Loser Match 24

The final match-up was:
 Match 26: Winner Match 23 v Winner Match 24

Combinations of matches in the quarter-finals
In the quarter-finals, all matches were played on 13 June 1995. The specific match-ups and schedule depended on which two third-placed teams qualified for the quarter-finals:

Qualified teams
The top two placed teams from each of the three groups, plus the two best-placed third teams, qualified for the knockout stage.

Bracket

Quarter-finals

Japan vs United States

Norway vs Denmark

Germany vs England

Sweden vs China PR

Semi-finals

United States vs Norway

Germany vs China PR

Third place play-off

Final

References

External links
FIFA Women's World Cup Sweden 1995, FIFA.com

1995 FIFA Women's World Cup
1995
China at the 1995 FIFA Women's World Cup
Denmark at the 1995 FIFA Women's World Cup
England at the 1995 FIFA Women's World Cup
Germany at the 1995 FIFA Women's World Cup
Japan at the 1995 FIFA Women's World Cup
Norway at the 1995 FIFA Women's World Cup
Sweden at the 1995 FIFA Women's World Cup
United States at the 1995 FIFA Women's World Cup